Roger Hawkins may refer to:

Roger Hawkins (drummer) (1945–2021), American drummer
Roger Hawkins (film director), Zimbabwean film director
Roger Hawkins (politician) (1915–1980), Rhodesian politician